Kamiyu (stylized as KAmiYU) is a Japanese group formed in 2010 by voice actors Hiroshi Kamiya and Miyu Irino.

History

Kamiyu was formed in 2010 by voice actors Hiroshi Kamiya and Miyu Irino on the label Kiramune. The two held their first event, titled Kamiyu in Wonderland, on July 18, 2010. The two also performed the song "My Proud, My Play!" as the ending theme song to Model Suit Gunpla Builders Beginning G, to which they also provided the voices to the characters. From November 6 to 7, 2010, they participated in Kiramune Music Festival 2010. The event exclusively sold their first single, "Kokoro no Tobira." On May 15, 2015, Kamiyu released their second single "Reason" as the ending theme song to Karneval, in which Kamiya also starred in as Gareki.

On March 10, 2018, Kamiyu performed at Kiramune Music Festival 2018. On September 1, 2018, Kamiyu held their fourth concert, Kamiyu in Wonderland 4, their first event in five years.

Members

 Hiroshi Kamiya
 Miyu Irino

Discography

Extended plays

Singles

References

External links

 

Musical groups established in 2010
2010 establishments in Japan